John Gillies more commonly known as Iain Gillies is a former association football player who represented New Zealand at international level.

Gillies spent most of his childhood in Mallaig before his family moved to New Zealand in 1949. He attended Sacred Heart College in Auckland and played for North Shore United. He returned to Scotland in 1950 and played for Nairn County F.C., spending 3 seasons there from the age of 15.
Gillies signed for Celtic for the 1955–1956 season where he played a number of games for the reserves, but did not manage a first team appearance. He was released on a free transfer the following summer and joined Crewe Alexandra F.C.

In 1959, Gillies returned to New Zealand and played for Eastern Union.

Gillies made a solitary official international appearance for New Zealand in a 0–4 loss to New Caledonia on 8 November 1967.

References 

Living people
New Zealand association footballers
New Zealand international footballers
1935 births
Association footballers not categorized by position